Masters from the Vaults is a 2002 DVD and Enhanced CD by the British rock band Atomic Rooster.
It features a 28-minute, 1972 live studio performance for Belgian TV.
The Enhanced CD features audio of the performance, with its corresponding video playable via a PC.

It was reissued as The Ultimate Anthology DVD, with three additional performances from the German Beat-Club TV show.

Track listing
Belgian TV 1972
 "Breakthrough" (Vincent Crane/Pat Darnell) 7:03
 "Black Snake" (Crane/Darnell) 6:54
 "A Spoonful of Bromide Helps the Pulse Rate Go Down" (Crane) 4:24
 "Can't Find a Reason" (Crane) 4:29
 "VUG" (Crane) 4:49 – mistitled "The Rock"
Ultimate Anthology reissue Beat Club performances
 "Friday the 13th" (Crane) 4:04 (1970)
 "Tomorrow Night" (Crane) 4:56 (1971)
 "Breakthrough" (Crane/Darnell) 4:54 (1972)

Personnel
Belgian TV
 Vincent Crane – Hammond organ & bass pedals, piano, electric pianos, ARP synthesizer
 Chris Farlowe – vocals
 Steve Bolton – electric guitar
 Ric Parnell – drums, percussion
Beat Club performances
 Vincent Crane – Hammond organ & bass pedals 
 John Du Cann – vocals, electric guitar ("Friday the 13th" and "Tomorrow Night")
 Carl Palmer – drums, percussion ("Friday the 13th")
 Paul Hammond – drums, percussion ("Tomorrow Night")
 Chris Farlowe – vocals ("Breakthrough")
 Steve Bolton – electric guitar ("Breakthrough")
 Ric Parnell – drums, percussion ("Breakthrough")

2002 video albums
Atomic Rooster live albums
Live video albums
2002 live albums